Sample entropy (SampEn) is a modification of approximate entropy (ApEn), used for assessing the complexity of physiological time-series signals, diagnosing diseased states. SampEn has two advantages over ApEn: data length independence and a relatively trouble-free implementation. Also, there is a small computational difference: In ApEn, the comparison between the template vector (see below) and the rest of the vectors also includes comparison with itself. This guarantees that probabilities  are never zero. Consequently, it is always possible to take a logarithm of probabilities. Because template comparisons with itself lower ApEn values, the signals are interpreted to be more regular than they actually are. These self-matches are not included in SampEn. However, since SampEn makes direct use of the correlation integrals, it is not a real measure of information but an approximation. The foundations and differences with ApEn, as well as a step-by-step tutorial for its application is available at.

There is a multiscale version of SampEn as well, suggested by Costa and others. SampEn can be used in biomedical and biomechanical research, for example to evaluate postural control.

Definition 
Like approximate entropy (ApEn), Sample entropy (SampEn) is a measure of complexity. But it does not include self-similar patterns as ApEn does. For a given embedding dimension , tolerance   and number of data points , SampEn is the negative natural logarithm of the probability that if two sets of simultaneous data points of length   have distance  then two sets of simultaneous data points of length   also have distance .

Now assume we have a time-series data set of length  with a constant time interval . We define a template vector of length , such that  and the distance  function  (i≠j) is to be the Chebyshev distance (but it could be any distance function, including Euclidean distance). We define the sample entropy to be

Where

 = number of template vector pairs having 

 = number of template vector pairs having 

Therefore,  will be always either be zero or positive value. A smaller value of  also indicates more self-similarity in data set or less noise.

Where std stands for standard deviation which should be taken over a very large dataset.

Multiscale SampEn 
And modified template vector is defined as

and sampEn can be written as

And we calculate  and  like before.

Implementation 
Sample entropy can be implemented easily in many different programming languages. Below lies a vectorized example written in Python. 
import numpy as np

def sampen(L, m, r):
    """Sample entropy."""
    N = len(L)
    B = 0.0
    A = 0.0
    
    # Split time series and save all templates of length m
    xmi = np.array([L[i : i + m] for i in range(N - m)])
    xmj = np.array([L[i : i + m] for i in range(N - m + 1)])

    # Save all matches minus the self-match, compute B
    B = np.sum([np.sum(np.abs(xmii - xmj).max(axis=1) <= r) - 1 for xmii in xmi])

    # Similar for computing A
    m += 1
    xm = np.array([L[i : i + m] for i in range(N - m + 1)])

    A = np.sum([np.sum(np.abs(xmi - xm).max(axis=1) <= r) - 1 for xmi in xm])

    # Return SampEn
    return -np.log(A / B)

An example written in other languages can be found:
 Matlab
 R.

See also 

 Kolmogorov complexity
 Approximate entropy

References 

Statistical signal processing
Entropy
Articles with example Python (programming language) code